Ceutholopha is a genus of snout moths. It was erected by Zeller in 1867, and is known from Africa, Australia and India.

Species
 Ceutholopha isidis (Zeller, 1867)
 Ceutholopha petalocosma (Meyrick, 1882)

References

Phycitini
Pyralidae genera